Lac-à-Beauce Water Aerodrome  is located on Lac-à-Beauce, Quebec, Canada and is open from May until the middle of November.

References

Registered aerodromes in Mauricie
Seaplane bases in Quebec